Lowol Guéou is a commune in the Cercle of Bandigara in the Mopti Region of Mali. The commune contains 19 villages and in the 2009 census had a population of 11,348. The main village is Kargué.

References

External links
.
.

Communes of Mopti Region